The Military ranks of Syria are the military insignia used by the Syrian Armed Forces. The Syrian military ranks use a rank structure similar to that of the British Armed Forces and the French Armed Forces.

Commissioned officer ranks
The rank insignia of commissioned officers.

Other ranks
The rank insignia of non-commissioned officers and enlisted personnel.

References

External links
 

Syria
Military of Syria
Syria